Caloptilia hemidactylella is a moth of the family Gracillariidae. It is mostly found in central and northern Europe, although there are recent records from Belgium and the Netherlands. It is a rare species in Great Britain with no reliable records since the 1950s, when it was recorded in Gloucestershire. It is also believed to have been present in Northamptonshire in the 19th century.

Adults are on wing from September onwards.

The larvae feed on Acer campestre.

References

External links
 UKmoths
 bladmineerders.nl
 

hemidactylella
Moths of Europe
Moths described in 1775
Taxa named by Michael Denis
Taxa named by Ignaz Schiffermüller